Ivan Živanović (born 21 August 1995) is a Serbian football defender who plays for Šumadija 1903.

Honours
Radnički Kragujevac
Serbian League West: 2016–17

References

External links
 
 Ivan Živanović stats at utakmica.rs 
 

1995 births
Living people
Sportspeople from Kragujevac
Association football defenders
Serbian footballers
FK Radnički 1923 players
FK Šumadija 1903 players
Serbian First League players
Serbian SuperLiga players